Ibrahim El Hakami (born May 2, 1979) is a Saudi singer who rose to popularity around the world as the winner of Super Star 3, the pan-Arabic version of Pop Idol. Ibrahim won with 53% of the total vote against Shahd Barmada from Syria.

Ibrahim names Faiza Ahmad and Thekra as his main musical inspirations.

Super Star Performances
Top 21: أكذب عليك (Akdib Aleyk) by Warda
Top 12: انا الشاكي (Ana El Shaki) by Hussain Al Jassmi
Top 11: الغالي (El Fali) by Said Makawi
Top 10: اللي نسيك انساه (Elli Naseek Insa'a) by Abdallah El Rowaished
Top 10: ليل و رعد أو برد (Leel W Rahd W Bard) by Wael Kfoury
Top 8: أنا ناطر (Ana Nater) by Nabil Shaeil
Top 7: الحب الكبير (El Hob El Kebir) by Ragheb Alama
Top 6: اختلفنا (Ekhtalafna) by Mohamed Abdou
Top 5: موال (Mawal)
Top 5: البوسطة (El Posta) by Fairouz
Top 5: حرمت أحبك (Haramt Ahibak) by Warda
Top 5: ما يسوى (Ma Yiswa) by Hussain Al Jassmi
Top 3: بترحلك مشوار (Btrohlek Mishwar) by Wadih El Safi
Top 3: بعيد عنك (Ba'eed Anak) by Umm Kulthum
Top 3: وترحل (Weterhal) by Talal Meddah
Grand Final: ياللي تاعبنا (Yalli Ta'abna) by George Wassouf
Grand Final: اعترف لك (Ehtraflik) by Mohamed Abdou
Grand Final: سألوني الناس (Salouni El Nas) by Fairuz 
Grand Final Results Show: سمّعني غنية (Samani Ghaniya) by Abdul Majid Abdullah

External links
www.IbrahimElHakami.com – Official Website & Fan Club
Super Star Biography – Interview/Biography on the official Super Star 3 site

1979 births
Living people
21st-century Saudi Arabian male singers
Idols (TV series) winners
SuperStar (Arabic TV series)
Contestants from Arabic singing competitions
Saudi Arabian male film actors
Saudi Arabian male television actors